Regina Northeast is a provincial electoral district for the Legislative Assembly of Saskatchewan, Canada. This district includes the neighbourhoods of Parkridge, Uplands, Glencairn and Glencairn Village.

The district was created in 1967 out of parts of Regina North and Regina East.

Between 1991 and 1995, this riding was called "Regina Churchill Downs".

Kevin Doherty of the Saskatchewan Party won the riding in the general elections of 2011 and 2016, but announced his retirement from politics in the spring of 2018 and resigned the seat.  A by-election was held on September 12, 2018, and was won by Yens Pedersen of the New Democratic Party. Gary Grewal was the candidate for the Saskatchewan Party. Grewal defeated Pedersen at the 2020 general election.

Members of the Legislative Assembly

Election results

 
|NDP
|Dwayne Yasinowski
|align="right"|2,663
|align="right"|38.70
|align="right"|-10.14

|-
 
| style="width: 130px" |NDP
|Ron Harper
|align="right"|3,995
|align="right"|48.83
|align="right"|-12.47

|- bgcolor="white"
!align="left" colspan=3|Total
!align="right"|8,181
!align="right"|100.00
!align="right"|

|-
 
| style="width: 130px" |NDP
|Ron Harper
|align="right"|4,428
|align="right"|61.30
|align="right"|+8.83

|Prog. Conservative
|George Marcotte
|align="right"|63
|align="right"|0.87
|align="right"|-

|- bgcolor="white"
!align="left" colspan=3|Total
!align="right"|7,224
!align="right"|100.00
!align="right"|

|-
 
| style="width: 130px" |NDP
|Ron Harper
|align="right"|3,193
|align="right"|52.47
|align="right"|-11.76

|- bgcolor="white"
!align="left" colspan=3|Total
!align="right"|6,086
!align="right"|100.00
!align="right"|

|-
 
| style="width: 130px" |NDP
|Edward Shillington
|align="right"|4,303
|align="right"|64.23
|align="right"|-5.71

 
|Prog. Conservative
|Douglas Berlin
|align="right"|416
|align="right"|6.21
|align="right"|-1.43
|- bgcolor="white"
!align="left" colspan=3|Total
!align="right"|6,699
!align="right"|100.00
!align="right"|

|-
 
| style="width: 130px" |NDP
|Edward Shillington
|align="right"|6,049
|align="right"|69.94
|align="right"|+5.91

 
|Prog. Conservative
|John Bergen
|align="right"|661
|align="right"|7.64
|align="right"|-20.06
|- bgcolor="white"
!align="left" colspan=3|Total
!align="right"|8,649
!align="right"|100.00
!align="right"|

|-
 
| style="width: 130px" |NDP
|Edwin Tchorzewski
|align="right"|6,845
|align="right"|64.03
|align="right"|-6.94
 
|Prog. Conservative
|Noel Klock
|align="right"|2,962
|align="right"|27.70
|align="right"|+4.36

|- bgcolor="white"
!align="left" colspan=3|Total
!align="right"|10,691
!align="right"|100.00
!align="right"|

|-
 
| style="width: 130px" |NDP
|Edwin Tchorzewski
|align="right"|5,377
|align="right"|70.97
|align="right"|+32.46
 
|Prog. Conservative
|Wilma Staff
|align="right"|1,768
|align="right"|23.34
|align="right"|-34.05

|- bgcolor="white"
!align="left" colspan=3|Total
!align="right"|7,576
!align="right"|100.00
!align="right"|

|-
 
| style="width: 130px" |Prog. Conservative
|Russell Sutor
|align="right"|5,303
|align="right"|57.39
|align="right"|+29.01
 
|NDP
|Walt Smishek
|align="right"|3,559
|align="right"|38.51
|align="right"|-22.49

|- bgcolor="white"
!align="left" colspan=3|Total
!align="right"|9,241
!align="right"|100.00
!align="right"|

|-
 
| style="width: 130px" |NDP
|Walt Smishek
|align="right"|4,831
|align="right"|61.00
|align="right"|+7.68
 
|Prog. Conservative
|Warren Denzin
|align="right"|2,248
|align="right"|28.38
|align="right"|+6.47

|Independent
|Roger D. Annis
|align="right"|36
|align="right"|0.46
|align="right"|*
|- bgcolor="white"
!align="left" colspan=3|Total
!align="right"|7,920
!align="right"|100.00
!align="right"|

|-
 
| style="width: 130px" |NDP
|Walt Smishek
|align="right"|3,735
|align="right"|53.32
|align="right"|-14.55

 
|Prog. Conservative
|Christine Howard
|align="right"|1,535
|align="right"|21.91
|align="right"|-
|- bgcolor="white"
!align="left" colspan=3|Total
!align="right"|7,005
!align="right"|100.00
!align="right"|

|-
 
| style="width: 130px" |NDP
|Walt Smishek
|align="right"|8,760
|align="right"|67.87
|align="right"|+11.54

|- bgcolor="white"
!align="left" colspan=3|Total
!align="right"|12,907
!align="right"|100.00
!align="right"|

|-
 
| style="width: 130px" |NDP
|Walt Smishek
|align="right"|5,892
|align="right"|56.33
|align="right"|*

 
|Prog. Conservative
|Albert E. Wilson
|align="right"|1,224
|align="right"|11.70
|align="right"|*
|- bgcolor="white"
!align="left" colspan=3|Total
!align="right"|10,460
!align="right"|100.00
!align="right"|

References

External links 
Website of the Legislative Assembly of Saskatchewan
Saskatchewan Archives Board – Provincial Election Results By Electoral Division

Politics of Regina, Saskatchewan
Saskatchewan provincial electoral districts